New Gulf Airport (formerly T17) is a privately owned, public use airport located two nautical miles (4 km) east of the central business district of New Gulf, in Wharton County, Texas, United States.

Facilities and aircraft 
New Gulf Airport covers an area of 50 acres (20 ha) at an elevation of 100 feet (30 m) above mean sea level. It has one runway designated 15/33 with an asphalt surface measuring 4,300 by 75 feet (1,311 x 23 m).

For the 12-month period ending September 18, 2008, the airport had 100 general aviation aircraft operations.

References

External links 
  at Texas DOT Airport Directory
 Aerial image as of January 1995 from USGS The National Map

Airports in Texas
Transportation in Wharton County, Texas